Yuba Raj Dulal (Nepali: युवराच दुलाल) is Nepalese politician and member of the Bagmati Provincial Assembly from Sindhupalchok 2 (A). He is currently serving as Minister for Physical Infrastructure and Development of Bagmati Province.He had previously serving as Minister for Social Development of Bagmati Province (1 March 2018 – 25 December 2020).

References 

Living people
Nepalese politicians
Members of the Provincial Assembly of Bagmati Province
Year of birth missing (living people)